Biatora ligni-mollis is a species of lichen in the family Ramalinaceae, first found in inland rainforests of British Columbia.

References

Further reading
Sérusiaux, Emmanuël, et al. "Lecidea doliiformis belongs to Micarea, Catillaria alba to Biatora, and Biatora ligni-mollis occurs in Western Europe."The Bryologist 113.2 (2010): 333-344.
Printzen, Christian. "A molecular phylogeny of the lichen genus Biatora including some morphologically similar species." The Lichenologist 46.03 (2014): 441–453.

ligni-mollis
Lichen species
Lichens of Western Canada
Lichens described in 2009
Taxa named by Toby Spribille
Fungi without expected TNC conservation status